Oldřich Nejedlý (26 December 1909 – 11 June 1990) was a Czech footballer, who spent his entire professional career at Sparta Prague as an inside-forward. He is considered to be one of Czechoslovakia's greatest players of all time. He was the top goalscorer of the 1934 World Cup.

Club career 
Nejedlý played for Sparta Prague during his entire professional span. He scored 162 league goals in 187 games, winning four Czechoslovak First League championships in 1932, 1936, 1938 and 1939, adding a Mitropa Cup in 1935. He also scored 18 goals in 38 games for SK Rakovník (1943, 1944 and 1946), giving him a total of 180 league goals in 225 games. At the end of his career, he wore the shirt of his home club in Zebrak again and finally retired from active football at the age of almost 47 after breaking a leg.

International career 
For Czechoslovakia, Nejedlý scored 29 goals in 44 games. He was awarded the Bronze Ball in the 1934 World Cup as the third most outstanding player of the tournament and was voted into the All-Star Team of the tournament. He would have gone on to play more games and score more goals for the Czechoslovakia had he not broken his leg in the 1938 World Cup which effectively ended his International career.

Furthermore, he was a participant in two World Cups, in 1934 in Italy and 1938 in France. Nejedlý was the outright top scorer in the 1934 World Cup with five goals. This has been officially recognized by FIFA since November 2006, as he was initially credited with only four, making him joint top scorer with Angelo Schiavio and Edmund Conen. He also scored two goals in the 1938 World Cup.

Nejedlý died in 1990, aged 80, while the 1990 FIFA World Cup was being played, a tournament which, as the 1934 edition, took place in Italy.

Career statistics

International

References

External links 
 
 Oldřich Nejedlý Biography 

1909 births
1990 deaths
Czech footballers
Czechoslovak footballers
1934 FIFA World Cup players
1938 FIFA World Cup players
Czechoslovakia international footballers
AC Sparta Prague players
Association football forwards
People from Beroun District
People from the Kingdom of Bohemia
Sportspeople from the Central Bohemian Region